Thomas Valentine Cooper (January 16, 1835 - December 19, 1909), also known as Thomas V. Cooper, was an American politician from Pennsylvania who served as a Republican member of the Pennsylvania House of Representatives for Delaware County for the 1870 and 1872 terms. Cooper served as a member of the Pennsylvania State Senate for district 5 from 1873 to 1874 and for district 9 from 1875 to 1889.  He was reelected to the Pennsylvania House of Representatives in 1901 and served until his death in 1909.

Cooper served as a private and an officer in the Union Army during the Civil War, was a newspaper editor of the Delaware County American newspaper for 54 years and an author of books on political and civil war history.

Early life and education
Cooper was born in Cadiz, Ohio to Dr. J.W. and Henrietta (Fields) Cooper.

From 1861 to 1864, Cooper served in the Union Army during the Civil War for three months as first lieutenant in the 4th Pennsylvania Reserve Regiment and for three years as a private in Company C, 26th Pennsylvania Infantry. He served in 13 engagements during the war including Second Bull Run, Chancellorsville, Fredericksburg, Gettysburg, the Wilderness and Spotsylvania Court House.

Career
In 1855, Cooper founded the Media Advertiser newspaper.  In 1856, the name was changed to the Media Advertiser and Delaware County American and again in 1859 to the Delaware County American.

Cooper served as a delegate to the 1860 Republican National Convention in Chicago, Illinois and had a pivotal role in the nomination of Abraham Lincoln.

In 1865, Cooper received an appointment from the Secretary of War, Edwin Stanton, as director of government printing.  He became the publisher of the Soldier's Journal but turned down a permanent appointment as director of the Bureau of Military Printing.

In 1869, Cooper was elected to the Pennsylvania House of Representatives for Delaware County, was defeated in 1871 and reelected in 1872. The following year, Cooper was elected to the Pennsylvania State Senate and was reelected continuously until 1889. In 1878, he was president of the Senate.

In 1889, Cooper was appointed by President Benjamin Harrison as collector of the Port of Philadelphia, and in 1900, he was elected again to the Pennsylvania House of Representatives for Delaware County and served until his death in 1909.

Personal life
In 1858, Cooper married Ada F. Turner and together they had six children.

Cooper was a member of the George W. Bartram Lodge, Free and Accepted Masons and of the Bradbury Post, Grand Army of the Republic.

Cooper died in his home in a fire started by his own cigar and was interred at Media Cemetery in Upper Providence Township, Delaware County, Pennsylvania.

Bibliography
American politics (non-partisan) From the Beginning to Date, Fireside Publishing Company, 1892
Campaign of '84, Baird & Dillon, 1884
Pennsylvania's Memorial Days, September 11 and 12, 1889: The 26th Pennsylvania Volunteers, Self-published, 1889

References

External links

|-

|-

1835 births
1909 deaths
19th-century American newspaper editors
19th-century American politicians
20th-century American politicians
American Freemasons
Burials at Media Cemetery
Editors of Pennsylvania newspapers
Republican Party members of the Pennsylvania House of Representatives
Pennsylvania Reserves
Republican Party Pennsylvania state senators
People from Cadiz, Ohio
People from Media, Pennsylvania
People of Pennsylvania in the American Civil War
Union Army officers